Juan Miguel Castillo Suero (born 11 May 1993) is  a Dominican professional basketball player. He plays for the Dominican national basketball team and Cariduros de Fajardo.

Professional career
Suero played the 2014–15 season at CB Clavijo, he averaged 1.56 point, 0.82 rebound and 0.45 assists. He moved to the Venezuela side Gaiteros del Zulia in the 2016–17 season, he averaged 22.25 point, 4.58 rebound and 4.57 assists. In the 2018-19 season, he moved to the Cariduros de Fajardo, he averaged 17.08 points, 5.36 rebound and 5.64 assists. He played the 2019–20 season at Dorados de Chihuahua, where he averaged 14.21 point, 5.13 rebound and 4.13 assists. He was named the 2019–20 LNBP East Zone MVP for his performance. He also played a game for Cariduros de Fajardo in the 2019–20 season.

International career
Suero played at the basketball event in the 2014 Central American and Caribbean Games, he averaged 1.5 point, 1 rebound and 1.5 assists. He also played in the 2016 Centrobasket, where he averaged 2 point, 1.2 rebound and 0.5 assist. He participated in the 2017 FIBA AmeriCup. He played in the 2019 FIBA Basketball World Cup in china, where he averaged 0.7 point and 1 rebound.

References

External links
 Juan Miguel Suero at RealGM

Living people
1993 births
CB Clavijo players
Dominican Republic men's basketball players
Dominican Republic expatriate basketball people in Mexico
Dominican Republic expatriate basketball people in Puerto Rico
Dominican Republic expatriate basketball people in Spain
Dominican Republic expatriate basketball people in Venezuela
Dorados de Chihuahua (LNBP) players
Forwards (basketball)
Sportspeople from Santo Domingo
2019 FIBA Basketball World Cup players
2014 Central American and Caribbean Games